Summer of 85 is a 2020 romantic drama film written and directed by François Ozon, partly based on the 1982 novel Dance on My Grave by Aidan Chambers. It stars Félix Lefebvre and Benjamin Voisin.

It was released in France on 14 July 2020 by Diaphana Distribution.

Plot
In the summer of 1985 in Normandy, Alexis (Alex), a 16-year-old who is fascinated by death, goes out to sea. A thunderstorm forms, causing his boat to capsize, but he is rescued by David, who is eighteen years old. After this incident, they grow very close and Alexis ends up helping out at David's family shop. The two end up having a relationship in secret, however, David claims he is bored and has an affair with Alexis' friend Kate. Alexis gets very angry and confronts David. They get into a fight and Alex throws a rock at David. Luckily he dodges the rock, but Alexis wrecks the shop and runs out. David chases after Alexis, but ends up dying in a motorcycle crash. Alex, feeling guilty, decides to carry out the pact formed between them: to go and dance on the grave of the one who dies first. Alex gets arrested while doing so, but is pitied by the judge and only charged with 140 hours of community service and a strong recommendation to visit a psychiatrist.

The film alternates between scenes of the two boys' relationship before David's death, and scenes of the aftermath of the accident, in which Alex finds healing in writing his story for his trial on his literature teacher's recommendation.

Cast
 Félix Lefebvre as Alexis Robin
 Benjamin Voisin as David Gorman
 Philippine Velge as Kate
 Valeria Bruni Tedeschi as David's mother
 Melvil Poupaud as Lefèvre
 Isabelle Nanty as Alexis's mother
 Laurent Fernandez as Alexis's father
 Aurore Broutin as a teacher
 Bruno Lochet as Bernard
 Yoann Zimmer as Luc
 Antoine Simoni as Chris

Production
In June 2019, it was announced that Félix Lefebvre, Benjamin Voisin and Philippine Velge had joined the cast of the film, with François Ozon directing from a screenplay he wrote. Principal photography began in May 2019.

Release
The film was set to premiere at the Cannes Film Festival in May 2020, prior to its cancellation due to the COVID-19 pandemic. It was released in France on 14 July 2020. In September 2020, Music Box Films acquired U.S. distribution rights to the film. It screened at the 2020 Toronto International Film Festival on 13 September 2020. It was released in the United States on 18 June 2021.

Reception

Critical reception
The site's critical consensus reads, "While not François Ozon's best work, Summer of 85 serves as a beguiling, bittersweet ode to teen love and its lingering after-effects." On Metacritic, the film holds a rating of 64 out of 100, based on 20 critics, indicating "generally favorable reviews".

References

External links
 
 
 

2020 films
2020 LGBT-related films
2020 romantic drama films
2020s coming-of-age drama films
2020s French-language films
2020s teen drama films
2020s teen romance films
Belgian coming-of-age drama films
Belgian LGBT-related films
Belgian romantic drama films
Belgian teen drama films
Coming-of-age romance films
French coming-of-age drama films
French LGBT-related films
French romantic drama films
French teen drama films
French-language Belgian films
Films about death
Films about writers
Films based on British novels
Films based on young adult literature
Films directed by François Ozon
Films set in 1985
Films set in Normandy
Films shot in Normandy
Films with screenplays by François Ozon
Gay-related films
Juvenile sexuality in films
LGBT-related coming-of-age films
LGBT-related romantic drama films
Teen LGBT-related films
2020s French films